Síofra is a feminine given name of Irish origin meaning elf or changeling. 

It may refer to:
Síofra Cléirigh Büttner (born 1995), Irish middle-distance runner
Síofra O'Leary (born 1968), Irish lawyer and judge at the European Court of Human Rights

Notes

Irish-language feminine given names